Naved Latif (born 21 February 1976) is a Pakistani former cricketer who played for the Pakistan national cricket team between 2001 and 2003. He was a right-handed batsman and a right-arm medium-pace bowler.

Domestic career
During 2004/05 he started playing Twenty20 cricket. He made a few appearances in the South Nottinghamshire League in Division 1 for Plumtree CC, before signing for Lahore Badshahs in the Indian Cricket League in early 2008.

Playing for Sargodha against Gujranwala in the 2000/01 Quaid-e-Azam Trophy, Latif scored 394 in exactly 13 hours. This was the highest first-class score made in Pakistan since Aftab Baloch's 428 at Karachi in 1973/74. It was also the tenth-highest score in the history of first-class cricket.

International career
He has played in one Test match, against the West Indies in January/February 2002.

Latif made his ODI debut match against Zimbabwe in 2001. He later made an outstanding century of 113 against Sri Lanka in his 2nd ODI match. His last appearance in ODI cricket was in 2003 against South Africa.

See also
 One-Test wonder

Notes

References
 

1976 births
Living people
Pakistan One Day International cricketers
Pakistan Test cricketers
ICL Pakistan XI cricketers
Lahore Badshahs cricketers
Pakistani cricketers
Sargodha cricketers
Pakistan Customs cricketers
Bahawalpur cricketers
Allied Bank Limited cricketers
National Bank of Pakistan cricketers
Faisalabad cricketers
Faisalabad Wolves cricketers
Punjab (Pakistan) cricketers
Pakistan Telecommunication Company Limited cricketers
Cricketers from Sargodha